Olesno  is a village in Dąbrowa County, Lesser Poland Voivodeship, in southern Poland. It is the seat of the gmina (administrative district) called Gmina Olesno.

The village has a population of 1,708.

References

Villages in Dąbrowa County